Raritan Township is a township in Hunterdon County, in the U.S. state of New Jersey. As of the 2020 United States census, the township's population was 23,447, an increase of 1,262 (+5.7%) from the 2010 census count of 22,185, which in turn reflected an increase of 2,376 (+12.0%) from the 19,809 counted in the 2000 census. The township is located within the heart of the Amwell Valley and Raritan Valley regions, as the South Branch of the Raritan River (along with the Neshanic River) flows through the center of the township. The northwestern portion of the township is located on the Hunterdon Plateau.

Raritan was incorporated as a township by an act of the New Jersey Legislature on April 2, 1838, from portions of the now-defunct Amwell Township. Flemington was formed within the township on March 14, 1870, and became an independent borough on April 7, 1910. Portions of the township were ceded to East Amwell Township in 1854 and 1897.

The township's name is derived from the Raritan tribe, a Native American band of Lenape people that inhabited Central New Jersey. The name of the tribe is said to mean "forked river", "stream overflows" or "point on a tidal river".

Geography
According to the United States Census Bureau, the township had a total area of 37.65 square miles (97.52 km2), including 37.48 square miles (97.08 km2) of land and 0.17 square miles (0.44 km2) of water (0.46%).

Raritan Township completely surrounds Flemington, making it part one of 21 pairs of "doughnut towns" in the state, where one municipality entirely surrounds another. It borders the municipalities of Clinton Township, Delaware Township, East Amwell Township, Franklin Township and Readington Township in Hunterdon County; and Hillsborough Township in Somerset County.

Unincorporated communities, localities and place names located partially or completely within the township include: Cloverhill, Copper Hill, Croton, Flemington Junction, Klinesville, Larisons Corners, Muirhead, Reaville, as well as Bartles Corners, Gary Corner, Mount Carmel, Rockefellows Mills, Thachers Hill and Voorhees Corner.

Demographics

2010 census

The Census Bureau's 2006–2010 American Community Survey showed that (in 2010 inflation-adjusted dollars) median household income was $109,941 (with a margin of error of +/− $7,543) and the median family income was $130,514 (+/− $10,612). Males had a median income of $95,123 (+/− $8,996) versus $62,229 (+/− $3,584) for females. The per capita income for the borough was $48,782 (+/− $2,900). About 2.0% of families and 4.6% of the population were below the poverty line, including 3.6% of those under age 18 and 6.2% of those age 65 or over.

2000 census
As of the 2000 United States census there were 19,809 people, 6,939 households, and 5,391 families residing in the township.  The population density was 523.5 people per square mile (202.1/km2).  There were 7,094 housing units at an average density of 187.5 per square mile (72.4/km2).  The racial makeup of the township was 93.22% White, 1.23% African American, 0.09% Native American, 3.50% Asian, 0.01% Pacific Islander, 0.68% from other races, and 1.27% from two or more races. Hispanic or Latino of any race were 2.79% of the population.

There were 6,939 households, out of which 43.0% had children under the age of 18 living with them, 68.2% were married couples living together, 7.0% had a female householder with no husband present, and 22.3% were non-families. 18.2% of all households were made up of individuals, and 5.6% had someone living alone who was 65 years of age or older.  The average household size was 2.81 and the average family size was 3.24.

In the township the population was spread out, with 29.3% under the age of 18, 4.6% from 18 to 24, 32.6% from 25 to 44, 24.7% from 45 to 64, and 8.9% who were 65 years of age or older. The median age was 37 years. For every 100 females, there were 94.1 males.  For every 100 females age 18 and over, there were 90.0 males.

The median income for a household in the township was $85,996, and the median income for a family was $96,336. Males had a median income of $69,485 versus $41,911 for females. The per capita income for the township was $38,919.  About 1.2% of families and 2.0% of the population were below the poverty line, including 1.6% of those under age 18 and 2.9% of those age 65 or over.

Government

Local government
Raritan Township is governed under the Township form of government, one of 141 municipalities (of the 564) statewide that use the Township form. The Township Committee is comprised of five members, who are elected directly by the voters at-large in partisan elections to serve three-year terms of office on a staggered basis, with either one or two seats coming up for election each year as part of the November general election in a three-year cycle. At an annual reorganization meeting, the Township Committee selects one of its members to serve as Mayor and another as Deputy Mayor. The mayor presides at Township Committee meetings and votes as a member of the committee, but has no other special powers under the township form of government law. All legislative and executive powers, including the power of appointments, are exercised by the committee as a whole.

, the members of the Raritan Township Committee are Mayor Robyn Fatooh (R, term on committee and as mayor ends December 31, 2023), Deputy Mayor Scott Sipos (R, term on committee ends 2024; term as deputy mayor ends 2023), Gary Hazard (R, 2023), Bob King (R, 2025) and Scott R. MacDade (R, 2025).

In June 2022, Jeff Kuhl resigned from the seat he had held expiring in December 2024 in order to fill a vacant seat on the Hunterdon County Board of County Commissioners. The Township Committee appointed Bob King to fill Kuhl's vacant committee seat; King will serve on an interim basis until the November 2022 general election, when voters will choose a candidate to serve the balance of the term of office.

Federal, state and county representation
Raritan Township is located in the 7th Congressional District and is part of New Jersey's 16th state legislative district.

Politics
As of March 2011, there were a total of 15,130 registered voters in Raritan Township, of which 3,008 (19.9%) were registered as Democrats, 4,944 (32.7%) were registered as Republicans and 7,166 (47.4%) were registered as Unaffiliated. There were 12 voters registered as Libertarians or Greens.

In the 2012 presidential election, Republican Mitt Romney received 57.8% of the vote (6,798 cast), ahead of Democrat Barack Obama with 41.2% (4,843 votes), and other candidates with 1.0% (118 votes), among the 11,834 ballots cast by the township's 16,049 registered voters (75 ballots were spoiled), for a turnout of 73.7%. In the 2008 presidential election, Republican John McCain received 54.7% of the vote (6,705 cast), ahead of Democrat Barack Obama with 43.5% (5,339 votes) and other candidates with 1.0% (121 votes), among the 12,261 ballots cast by the township's 15,254 registered voters, for a turnout of 80.4%. In the 2004 presidential election, Republican George W. Bush received 59.7% of the vote (6,727 ballots cast), outpolling Democrat John Kerry with 39.7% (4,470 votes) and other candidates with 0.7% (97 votes), among the 11,265 ballots cast by the township's 13,693 registered voters, for a turnout percentage of 82.3.

In the 2013 gubernatorial election, Republican Chris Christie received 74.1% of the vote (5,504 cast), ahead of Democrat Barbara Buono with 24.5% (1,818 votes), and other candidates with 1.5% (109 votes), among the 7,595 ballots cast by the township's 16,003 registered voters (164 ballots were spoiled), for a turnout of 47.5%. In the 2009 gubernatorial election, Republican Chris Christie received 64.8% of the vote (5,440 ballots cast), ahead of  Democrat Jon Corzine with 25.9% (2,173 votes), Independent Chris Daggett with 7.4% (618 votes) and other candidates with 0.6% (47 votes), among the 8,396 ballots cast by the township's 14,991 registered voters, yielding a 56.0% turnout.

Education
Students in public school for pre-kindergarten through eighth grade attend the Flemington-Raritan Regional School District, which also serves children from the neighboring community of Flemington. As of the 2018–19 school year, the district, comprised of six schools, had an enrollment of 3,079 students and 327.8 classroom teachers (on an FTE basis), for a student–teacher ratio of 9.4:1. The district consists of four K–4 elementary schools, one intermediate school for grades 5 and 6 and a middle school for grades 7 and 8. Schools in the district (with 2018–19 enrollment data from the National Center for Education Statistics) are 
Barley Sheaf School (350 students; in grades K–4, located in Flemington), 
Copper Hill School (413; Pre-K–4, Ringoes), 
Francis A. Desmares School (447; K–4, Flemington), 
Robert Hunter School (388; K–4, Flemington), 
Reading-Fleming Intermediate School (682; 5–6, Flemington) and 
J. P. Case Middle School (781; 7–8, Flemington). Raritan Township is allocated seven of the nine seats on the regional district's board of education.

Public school students in ninth through twelfth grades attend Hunterdon Central Regional High School, part of the Hunterdon Central Regional High School District, which serves students in central Hunterdon County from Raritan Township and from Delaware Township, East Amwell Township, Flemington and Readington Township. As of the 2018–19 school year, the high school had an enrollment of 2,844 students and 238.8 classroom teachers (on an FTE basis), for a student–teacher ratio of 11.9:1. Seats on the high school district's nine-member board of education are allocated based in the population of the five constituent municipalities who participate in the school district, with three seats allocated to Raritan Township.

Eighth grade students from all of Hunterdon County are eligible to apply to attend the high school programs offered by the Hunterdon County Vocational School District, a county-wide vocational school district that offers career and technical education at its campuses in Raritan Township and at programs sited at local high schools, with no tuition charged to students for attendance.

Transportation

Several major roads in Raritan Township.

Major county roads that go through the township include CR 514 (which runs along the southeastern border), CR 523 and CR 579 (which runs along the southwestern border).

The closest Interstate highway is Interstate 78 in neighboring Clinton and Franklin Townships.

Public transportation
The Hunterdon County LINK provide local bus service on Route 14 between Lambertville and Flemington; Route 15 between Flemington and Hampton; Routes 16 / 19 / 21 which operate to / from Flemington; Route 17 / 18 between Milford and Clinton; and Route 23 between Flemington and Bridgewater Commons Mall / Somerville.

Rail service

The Black River and Western Railroad is a historic short-line railroad that passes through the township. It operates today as a heritage railway.

The Norfolk Southern Railway's Lehigh Line (formerly the mainline of the Lehigh Valley Railroad), runs through most of the northeast part of Raritan Township close to its northeast boundary.

Points of interest

On December 14, 1776, during the American Revolutionary War, local militia led by Captain John Schenck ambushed a party of British dragoons returning from a raid on Flemington. The British leader, Cornet Francis Geary, was killed during this skirmish, known as the Ambush of Geary, that took place between Copper Hill and Larison's Corners. On December 14, 1976, as part of the United States Bicentennial, Raritan Township dedicated a monument to the Amwell Militia at the site along US 202 and Route 31 northbound. A memorial monument to Geary is located nearby along with a historical information plaque describing the Amwell Skirmish.

The John Reading Farmstead, built in 1760 for John Reading, former governor of the Province of New Jersey, is listed on the National Register of Historic Places. It is also a contributing property of the Raritan–Readington South Branch Historic District.

Notable people

People who were born in, residents of, or otherwise closely associated with Raritan Township include:
 Marcia A. Karrow (born 1959), member of the New Jersey Senate who served on the Raritan Township Committee, including in 1998 as its mayor
 Orlie Pell (1900–1975), pacifist, philosopher and activist.
 Miles Ross (1827–1903), represented New Jersey's 3rd congressional district in the United States House of Representatives from 1875 to 1883
 Alex Shaffer (born 1993), actor who appeared in the 2011 film Win Win

References

External links

Raritan Township website
Hunterdon County webpage for Raritan Township
Flemington-Raritan Regional School District

School Data for the Flemington-Raritan Regional School District, National Center for Education Statistics
Hunterdon Central Regional High School District

School Data for the Hunterdon Central Regional High School, National Center for Education Statistics
Hunterdon Land Trust Alliance

 
1838 establishments in New Jersey
Populated places established in 1838
Township form of New Jersey government
Townships in Hunterdon County, New Jersey